Puna is a suburb of Surat in the Indian state of Gujarat. The city is located 9 km east of Surat on the Surat-Bardoli highway NH6. Puna comes under the Surat Metropolitan Region.

Geography 
It has an average elevation of 16 metres (66 feet).

Demographics
 India census, Puna has a population of 98,523. Males constitute 51% of the population and females 49%. Puna has an average literacy rate of 74%, higher than the national average of 59.5%: male literacy is 81%, and female literacy is 63%. In Puna, 14% of the population is under 6 years of age.

Transport 
By road: Puna is 6 km from Udhana and 9 km from Surat.

By air: the nearest airport is Surat, which is 25 km from Puna.

See also 
List of tourist attractions in Surat

References

Suburban area of Surat
Neighbourhoods in Surat